United Nations Security Council Resolution 121, adopted unanimously on December 12, 1956, after examining the application of Japan for membership in the United Nations, the UN Security Council recommended to the General Assembly that Japan be admitted.

See also
List of United Nations Security Council Resolutions 101 to 200 (1953–1965)
Japan and the United Nations

References
Text of the Resolution at undocs.org

External links
 

 0121
 0121
 0121
1956 in Japan
December 1956 events